Émile Duval (5 July 1907 – 13 April 1965) was a French long-distance runner. He competed in the marathon at the 1936 Summer Olympics.

References

1907 births
1965 deaths
Athletes (track and field) at the 1936 Summer Olympics
French male long-distance runners
French male marathon runners
Olympic athletes of France
Sportspeople from Pas-de-Calais
20th-century French people